Mister Pop is the fifth studio album by New Zealand group The Clean, released in 2009.

Track listing

References

External links

2009 albums
The Clean albums